Glipa nigrosignata is a species of beetle in the genus Glipa. It was described in 1882.

References

nigrosignata
Beetles described in 1882